San Nicola in Carcere (Italian, "St Nicholas in prison") is a titular church in Rome near the Forum Boarium in rione Sant'Angelo. It is one of the traditional stational churches of Lent.

History
The first church on the site was probably built in the 6th century, and a 10th-century inscription may be seen on a fluted column next to the entrance, but the first definite dedication is from a plaque on the church dating to 1128. The inscriptions found in S. Angelo, a valuable source illustrating the history of the Basilica, have been collected and published by Vincenzo Forcella.

It was constructed in and from the ruins of the Forum Holitorium and its Roman temples, along with a jail (carcer) which a tradition (supported by Pliny's history of Rome) states was sited in the temples' ruins.  However, the in Carcere (in jail) part of the name of the church was only changed to "in Carcere Tulliano" in the 14th century, owing to an erroneous identification. The prison was really that of Byzantine times (LPD i.515, n13; ii.295, n12).

Spolia from all these ancient remains is still apparent in the church's construction, most particularly three columns from the Temple of Juno Sospita which are incorporated into both the 10th century and 1599 frontal façades of the church. The columns of the Temple of Janus, dedicated by Gaius Duilius after his naval victory at the Battle of Mylae in 260 BC, can still be seen as being incorporated into the northern wall of the church. Six columns from the  Temple of Spes are visible in the southern wall.

The dedication to St Nicholas was made by the Greek population in the area.  In the 11th century, it was known as the church of Petrus Leonis, referring to the converted Jewish family, the Pierleoni, who rebuilt the nearby Theatre of Marcellus as a fortress. One of their members, Pietro Pierleone, was an important cardinal in the 1120s and was elected Pope Anacletus II, though he was later branded a schismatic antipope.

The church was rebuilt in 1599, with a new facade by Giacomo della Porta (though the medieval campanile - originally a fortified tower, then adapted to a bell tower after being abandoned - was not altered). Stairs under the altar lead to the crypt and to the base of the former Roman temples. Beneath the high altar is also an ancient basalt bath tub containing martyrs' relics.

Present

The church is known for celebrations to the devotion of the Madonna; one is the Italian Our Lady of Pompeii, whose feast is celebrated here, and the other is the Mexican Our Lady of Guadalupe, a reproduction of whose miraculous painting, sent here from Mexico in 1773, is shown.

Nearby structures include:
Piazza Venezia
Campidoglio
Theatre of Marcellus
Temple of Portunus in the Forum Boarium
Santa Maria in Cosmedin and the Bocca della Verità

List of cardinal-deacons
 Ottaviano de Monticello (1138–1151) 
 Ottone (1152–1174)
 Vibiano (1175)
 Gerardo (1175–1178)
 Bernardo (1178–1181)
 Pietro Diana (1185–1188) 
 Egidio Pierleoni (1190–1194)
 Gerard OCist (1198–1199)
 Guido Pierleone (1205–1221)
 Otto of Tonengo (1227–1244)
 Giovanni Gaetano Orsini (1244–1277)
 Guglielmo Longhi (1294–1319)
 Giovanni Arlotti (1328), pseudocardinal
 Landolfo Maramaldo (1381–1415)
 Rodrigo Lanzol-Borja y Borja (1456–1484)
 Giovanni Battista Savelli (1484–1498)
 Amanieu d'Albret (1500–1520)
 Agostino Trivulzio, in commendam (1520–1531)
 Íñigo López de Mendoza y Zúñiga (1531–1537)
 Rodrigo Luis de Borja y de Castre Pinòs (1537)
 Girolamo Grimaldi, in commendam (1537–1538)
 Niccolò Caetani di Sermoneta (1538–1552)
 Giacomo Savelli (1552–1558)
 Giovanni Battista Consiglieri (1558–1559)
 Carlo Carafa (1560–1561)
 Francesco II Gonzaga (1561–1562)
 Georges d'Armagnac (1562–1585)
 Francesco Sforza (1585–1588)
 Ascanio Colonna (1588–1591)
 Federico Borromeo (1591–1593)
 Pietro Aldobrandini (1593–1604)
 Carlo Emmanuele Pio di Savoia (1604–1623)
 Carlo di Ferdinando de' Medici (1623–1644)
 Giangiacomo Teodoro Trivulzio (1644)
 Rinaldo d'Este (1644–1668)
 Friedrich von Hessen-Darmstadt (1668–1670)
 Paolo Savelli (1670–1678)
 Urbano Sacchetti (1681–1689)
 Gianfrancesco Ginetti (1689–1691)
 vacant (1691–1699)
 Henri Albert de La Grange d'Arquien (1699–1707)
 Lorenzo Altieri (1707–1718)
 Damian Hugo Philipp Reichsgraf von Schönborn-Buchheim (1721)
 vacant (1721–1728)
 Antonio Banchieri (1728–1733)
 vacant (1733–1738)
 Carlo Della Torre di Rezzonico (1738–1747)
 Mario Bolognetti (1747–1751)
 Domenico Orsini d'Aragona (1751–1763)
 vacant (1763–1770)
 Giovanni Battista Rezzonico (1770–1783)
 Romoaldo Braschi-Onesti (1787–1800)
 Marino Carafa di Belvedere (1801–1807)
 vacant (1807–1816)
 Pietro Vidoni (1816–1830)
 vacant (1830–1834)
 Nicola Grimaldi (1834–1845)
  (1845)
 Pietro Marini (1847–1863)
 vacant (1863–1874)
 Camillo Tarquini SJ (1874)
  (1875–1876)
 Joseph Hergenröther (1879–1888)
 vacant (1888–1907)
 Gaetano De Lai (1907–1911)
 vacant (1911–1922)
 Giuseppe Mori (1922–1933) pro hac vice (1934)
 Nicola Canali (1935–1961)
 vacant (1961–1967)
 Patrick Aloysius O'Boyle pro hac vice (1967–1987)
 Hans Urs von Balthasar SJ (1988)
 vacant (1988–1994)
 Alois Grillmeier SJ (1994–1998)
 Zenon Grocholewski (2001–2020)
 Silvano Maria Tomasi (2020-present)

References

Bibliography

 Andreina Palombi, La basilica di San Nicola in Carcere: il complesso architettonico dei tre templi del Foro Olitorio (Roma: Istituto nazionale di studi romani, 2006).
 Franco Astolfi, I templi di San Nicola in Carcere (Roma : E.S.S. Editorial Service System, 1999). [Forma Urbis, 5. 1999, Supplemento].
 S. Nicola in Carcere (Roma : Istituto nazionale di studi romani, 1991). [no author]
 Giovanni Battista Proja, San Nicola in Carcere (Roma: Istituto di Studi Romani, 1981). [in Italian]
 Vincenzo Golzio, San Nicola in Carcere e i tre templi del Foro Olitorio (Roma: Libreria Fratelli Treves dell'Anonima Libraria Italiana, 1928). [in Italian]

External links
Spherical panorama of the church interior 
Underground ruins
High-resolution 360° Panoramas and Images of San Nicola in Carcere | Art Atlas

Nicola
Nicola
Nicola
6th-century churches
Roman Catholic churches completed in 1599
1599 establishments in Italy
Nicola Carcere
16th-century Roman Catholic church buildings in Italy
Saint Nicholas